The Beached Margin is a 1937 painting by the English painter Edward Wadsworth. It depicts a beach still life where three poles in the sand are decorated with semi-abstract objects and geometrical shapes.

Wadsworth was part of the British modernist group Unit One. He was well travelled and, for a British artist at the time, unusually informed about the contemporary art currents in continental Europe. When painting The Beached Margin he was influenced by the Italian painter Giorgio de Chirico. Wadsworth told the magazine Cavalcade that this painting and Visibility Moderate (1934) were based on "fishermen's flag poles, whipped by a sand-raising wind, [seen] on Hastings beach".

The Beached Margin was painted with tempera on linen laid on panel. It is signed "E. Wadsworth 1937". It was purchased by the Tate Gallery in 1938. As of 2017, it was not on display.

See also
 Metaphysical art

References

1937 paintings
Collection of the Tate galleries
Paintings by Edward Wadsworth